The San Diego Model Railroad Museum is a model railroad exhibit in San Diego, California. At 27,000 sq. ft., it is the largest such indoor exhibit in North America, and one of the largest in the world. The museum is located on the lower level of the Casa de Balboa Building on the Prado in Balboa Park.

Nearly three million people have passed through the center since it opened in 1982.

The San Diego Model Railroad Museum is a 501(c)(3) organization non-profit charity.

History
Model railroading in Balboa Park began at the 1935 California Pacific International Exposition. In the 1930s, pioneer model railroader Minton Cronkhite designed and directed the construction of a number of scale model railroads in the 1930s, including a large exposition O scale model railroad in Balboa Park. The Atchison, Topeka and Santa Fe Railway, as well as Pennsylvania Railroad, hired him to create giant model railroads for world fairs to stimulate interest in train travel and help revive the national economy during the years of the Great Depression. His 40-by-70-foot model railroad exhibit was the "chief transportation feature" of the 1935 exposition.

The San Diego Model Railroad Museum opened in 1982 with a mission to "preserve the heritage of railroading through a series of miniature representations of California railroads, research and preserve the history of model railroading, and educate the public in the many different aspects of railroading."

Exhibits
With 27,000 square feet (2508 m2) of exhibit space, the museum is home of some of the largest HO and N scale layouts of their types. There are two massive HO scale layouts, a  N scale layout, a  O scale layout, and a Lionel type 3-Rail O gauge Toy Train gallery.
 Cabrillo & Southwestern (O scale). This  layout is a freelance representation of a route from San Diego to Sacramento.
 Pacific Desert Lines (N scale). Based on a rail line that was surveyed but never built, this  layout features handlaid Code 40 track (0.040 inches - 1 mm high) and 33 scale miles (1,089 actual feet - 331 m) of mainline track.
 San Diego & Arizona Eastern RR (HO scale). This  layout is based on the prototype San Diego and Arizona Eastern Railway line from San Diego Union Station eastward through Carriso Gorge to the desert floor at El Centro.
 Tehachapi Pass (HO scale). This two-level layout represents the joint Southern Pacific / Santa Fe railroad from Bakersfield to Mojave, California, of the 1950s, including the Tehachapi Loop. The model is unique for its size and geographic fidelity. Thousands of photographs of the prototype were used to closely model the details of the actual area with nearly curve-for-curve and switch-for-switch accuracy.
 Toy Train Gallery (3-Rail O gauge). A 42 by 44 foot permanent layout that has four separate main lines, realistic scenery, and many operating accessories. Club members control the trains with modern remote control systems such as LEGACY by Lionel and DCS by MTH. This gallery features operating toy trains of "Lionel type" 3-Rail O gauge, a collection of rare Lionel and American Flyer cars from the 1920s though the 1950s, and modern toy trains from Lionel, MTH, K-Line, and Atlas-O. There is also an interactive kids layout where children of all ages can push a button to run a train.

Library
The museum has a specialized library related to both model railroading and real railroads. The library has a collection of books, magazines, VHS tapes, blueprints and other materials for research. It is a reference library and the materials do not circulate, but it is open for any attendee of the museum.

Railroad clubs
The model railroads were built and are maintained by four local railroad clubs, which exhibit their respective displays as nonprofit organizations. The clubs are:
 San Diego Model Railroad Association, formally, The San Diego Model Railroad Club
 La Mesa Model Railroad Club
 San Diego Society of N-Scale
 San Diego 3-Railers

See also 

 List of railway museums

References

External links

 San Diego Model Railroad Museum website
 San Diego Society of N Scale
 San Diego Model Railroad Association
 La Mesa Model Railroad Club
 San Diego 3-Railers Club

Museums in San Diego
Institutions accredited by the American Alliance of Museums
Model railway shows and exhibitions
Railroad museums in California
Libraries in San Diego
Balboa Park (San Diego)
Model railroads
Research libraries in the United States